Roehl Transport, Inc. is an American trucking company based in Marshfield, Wisconsin. The company provides national transportation and logistics services. It ranked 73rd on the Transport Topics Top 100 For-Hire list of US and Canadian freight carriers by revenue for 2021 with an estimated $450 million in revenue for the previous year.

History 
Everett Roehl founded Roehl Transport in 1962 with a single truck.

Starting in the late 1980s, the company began offering on the job training for recent commercial drivers license (CDL) school graduates. It also founded a certified truck driving school, the Roehl Transport CDL School, later renamed the Get Your CDL Program.

In 2013, Roehl bought Brock Cold Storage and Trucking merging Brock's trucking operations into Roehl but maintaining the cold storage business as a separate division, Roehl Cold Storage.

The company revised its driver pay calculations in 2019 to be based on address-to-address mileage. Roehl had previously used the "Practical Route Mileage" model, which calculates driver pay on city center-to-city center mileage, since 2004.

Operations 

The company has over 2,950 employees, 1,900 tractors and 5,200 trailers with major terminal operations in Marshfield and Appleton, Wisconsin, the Chicago area, Atlanta, Georgia, Phoenix, Arizona, and Dallas.

Sustainability 

In 2013, U.S. Oil's GAIN Clean Fuels division, in partnership with Roehl, opened a compressed natural gas (CNG) station at Roehl's Gary, Indiana terminal. Roehl operates CNG-fuelled trucks from several of its terminals.

References

External links 
 

Trucking companies of the United States
Privately held companies based in Wisconsin
Transport companies established in 1962
1962 establishments in Wisconsin
Family-owned companies of the United States